Malkit Singh, MBE (Malkit Singh Boparai; born c. 1963) is an England-based Punjabi bhangra singer. Born in Hussainpur and raised in Nakodar, he moved to Birmingham in 1984. Singh was the first Punjabi singer to be honoured with an MBE by Queen Elizabeth II at Buckingham Palace. He was most famous for the songs "Gur Nalo Ishq Mitha", "Tootak Tootak Tootiyan", "Kurri Garam Jayee", "Dekh li vilyait", "Chal Hun", and "Jind Mahi", the latter two from the soundtrack to the popular film Bend It Like Beckham.

Career
Malkit Singh had appeared on many Indian talk shows which were linked to Sikhism and Punjab on MTV Channel, Channel V, and all Indian channels. He was listed by the Guinness Book of Records as the biggest selling bhangra solo artist of all time, with sales of over 4.9 million records in his 32-year career. His song "Tutak Tutak Toothiyan" written by Veer Rahimpuri was the fastest-selling and most successful Bhangra single at the time. It was released with the 1990 album Tootak Tootak Toothian, which sold 2.5 million records, a record for Bhangra Indi-pop at the time.

Awards and recognition
 In 2005, Singh was awarded the "Commitment to Scene" award at the UK Asian Music Awards.
 In 2008, Malkit Singh was appointed Member of the Order of the British Empire (MBE) in the 2008 New Year Honours.
 In 2010, Singh was awarded "Outstanding Achievement" award at the Brit Asia TV Music Awards.
 In 2012, Singh was honoured with a star on the Birmingham Walk of Stars.

Discography

Duo collaboration

See also 

 List of British Sikhs

References

External links

Members of the Order of the British Empire
Punjabi-language singers
1962 births
Living people
People from Jalandhar